Carlo Rossi may refer to:

Carlo Rossi (architect) (1775–1849), Russian architect
Carlo Rossi (racing driver) (born 1955), former Italian race car driver
Carlo Rossi (politician) (1925–1998), Canadian politician
Carlo Rossi (lyricist) (1920–1989), Italian lyricist and record producer 
Carlo Rossi (general) (1880–1967), Italian general
Carlo Rossi (wine)
Carlo Ubaldo Rossi (1958–2015), Italian composer and music producer